KBPS may refer to

 kilobit per second, data rate unit usually abbreviated kbps
 kilobyte per second, abbreviated kBps
 KBPS (AM), radio station (1450 AM) licensed to Portland, Oregon, United States
 KQAC, radio station (89.9 FM) licensed to Portland, Oregon, United States known as KBPS-FM from 1981 to 2009

See also 
 KPBS (disambiguation)